Cliff's Silver Discs is a compilation EP by Cliff Richard and the Shadows, released in December 1960. It topped both the Record Retailer and Melody Maker EP charts.

Release and reception
Released at the beginning of December 1960, Cliff's Silver Discs contains four out of the six silver discs awarded to Richard and the Shadows up until then by Disc magazine for 250,000 sales. The first three tracks had been released as singles earlier in 1960, with the final track, "Travellin' Light", released the previous year. "Travellin' Light" was recorded in July 1959 and released in October 1959; then "Fall in Love with You", recorded in November 1959, was released in March 1960; then "Please Don't Tease", recorded in March and then released in June 1960; and then finally "Nine Times Out of Ten", also recorded in March, was released in September 1960. The two releases awarded silver discs not included on this EP are "Living Doll" and "A Voice in the Wilderness".

Reviewing for Disc, Keith Graham gave the EP five out of five stars, awarding it "EP Of The Month".

Upon entering the Record Retailer EP chart a week after its release, Cliff's Silver Discs topped the chart two weeks later, before falling three places the following week and rising back to the top the week after that. It spent 52 consecutive weeks on the chart, leaving the chart after the first week of December 1961. It re-entered the chart in the final week of January 1962 and stayed on the chart for another four weeks, making a total of 57 weeks on the chart. The EP performed even better on the Melody Maker EP chart, topping it for six weeks.

Track listing

Personnel
 Cliff Richard – vocals
 Hank Marvin – lead guitar, backing vocals (2)
 Bruce Welch – rhythm guitar, backing vocals (2)
 Jet Harris – bass guitar
 Tony Meehan – drums

Charts

References

1960 EPs
EMI Records EPs
Cliff Richard compilation albums
Albums produced by Norrie Paramor